Maguwo railway station, Indonesia (station code)
 Maximum gross weight, abbreviated "m g w" on road signs
 Media gateway, a translation unit between telecommunications networks
 Morgantown Municipal Airport, United States (IATA code)